West Drayton railway station serves West Drayton and Yiewsley, western suburbs of London. It is served by local trains operated by  the Elizabeth line. The station is managed by Transport for London (TfL).

History
West Drayton station is on the original line of the Great Western Railway, and was opened on 4 June 1838 at the same time as the line. However the original station was located slightly to the west of the current station, and was relocated to its current position from 9 August 1884 when the Staines and West Drayton Railway branch line to Staines was opened. The service was discontinued as uneconomic after 30 September 1885.

West Drayton was the junction station for both the Staines branch, and an earlier branch to  that opened on 8 September 1856.  The Uxbridge branch line closed to passengers on 10 September 1962, but the line south of the Grand Union Canal was retained for freight traffic until 8 January 1979.  The Staines branch closed to passengers on 29 March 1965, but freight trains still run from West Drayton serving the aviation fuel terminal for Heathrow Airport at Colnbrook and aggregates depots at Thorney and Colnbrook.

From 1895 the station was named West Drayton and Yiewsley; it reverted to the original name West Drayton on 6 May 1974.

In preparation for the introduction of Elizabeth line services, the operation of the station was transferred from Great Western Railway to MTR Crossrail on behalf of Transport for London at the end of 2017.

Description
West Drayton station is situated on Station Approach in Yiewsley. It is north of the centre of West Drayton and immediately to the south of the Grand Union Canal, in the London Borough of Hillingdon.

The station has five platforms. Platform 1 down main line (away from London), platform 2 is the up main line (towards London), platform 3 is the down relief line, platform 4 is the up relief line. A fifth platform on the up goods line is not used for passenger services. This is used for freight services to access the branch line to Colnbrook and also to wait to continue on the up relief line. The platforms on the main lines see little use, other than when the relief lines are closed for maintenance. Access between the platforms is via steps and a pedestrian underpass.

Crossrail and the Elizabeth Line
The station received major improvements through the Crossrail construction project in preparation for Elizabeth Line services which commenced in May 2022. A new glass and steel extension was built together with a redeveloped main ticket office and new platform canopies. The platforms were extended to be greater than 200m long, accessed by a new over platform footbridge with four lifts.

Services
Services at West Drayton are operated by the Elizabeth line using  EMUs.

The typical off-peak service in trains per hour is:
 4 tph to 

On Sundays, the service between London Paddington and Didcot Parkway is reduced to hourly in each direction.

Connections
London Buses routes 222, 350, 698, U1, U3 and U5 serve the station.

References

External links

 Train times and station information, from National Rail

To learn more about West Drayton check the community website at http://www.ub7.org.

Railway stations in the London Borough of Hillingdon
Great Western Main Line
Railway stations in Great Britain opened in 1838
Former Great Western Railway stations
Railway stations served by the Elizabeth line